ScS is a home furnishings retailer in the United Kingdom, specialising in sofas, carpets and flooring, dining and occasional furniture.

History 
ScS was established in Sunderland, Tyne and Wear in 1894, as a family owned home furnishings store. By the 1980s, there were eight ScS stores in the North East of England. In 1993, a management buy out enabled the business to expand out of the region, and become a prominent upholstered furniture retailer throughout the United Kingdom, with a focus on gaining presence in large retail parks.

As part of the company's growth strategy, in 1997, the business was listed on the Official List and, as ScS Upholstery plc, was admitted to trading on the London Stock Exchange’s main market for listed securities. Over the following ten years, the number of ScS stores grew to 95, supported by nine distribution centres.

2007–2008: Impact of Economic Downturn 
The ScS brand was adversely affected by the economic downturn in 2007 and 2008. Constraints on consumer lending and reduced disposable incomes saw a decrease in demand for ‘big-ticket’ items such as large home furnishings, manifesting in trading difficulties for ScS and pressure upon financial resources.

This was compounded by the withdrawal of credit insurance that had covered suppliers against ScS’ debt to them, and in 2008, ScS collapsed into administration. In order to generate a significant cash investment, both immediate and long term, ScS was sold to Sun Capital Partners in July 2008. Under new ownership, ScS increased their share of the upholstered furniture market from 5% in 2009 to 7.9% in 2013.

2011: Expansion of interest free credit 
In 2011, ScS expanded their four years interest free credit offering to include all of their products.

This year also saw a change of products being offered, as carpets were also added to their core range

2014: Partnership with House of Fraser 
In May 2014, a pilot partnership with United Kingdom department store chain House of Fraser commenced, with ScS concessions opening in three stores in the North East of England. Following its success, the concessions were rolled out at a further thirty six House of Fraser stores, under their ‘For Living’ brand during 2014. The House of Fraser For Living website was launched in September 2014.

In November 2018, this arrangement was discontinued, due to House of Fraser going into administration. They pulled out of the stores on 16 January 2019.

2015: Return to Stock Market 
In January 2015, ScS returned to the stock market, with an opening price of 185p an share. The stock market return was directed by Alan Smith, former chief executive of Somerfield.

ScS currently has 101 stores located in England, Scotland and Wales, in addition to an online store at ScS.co.uk, first available in 2009, but relaunched in July 2014.

Products

Expansion of product range and rebranding 
In 2010, the ScS product range was expanded beyond upholstered furniture, to include dining and occasional furniture. The ScS product range was further expanded in 2012 to include flooring. The additions of these new products catalysed the rebranding of ScS as ‘Sofa Carpet Specialist’.

Third party products 
Until 2009, with the addition of La-Z-Boy products to the range, ScS sold no third party products. A second third party brand, G-Plan, was added in 2010.

Parker Knoll, the latest addition to the third party brands, was added to the range in March 2014.

Own brands 
In 2010, ScS launched its first own sofa brand, SiSi Italia. A second own brand, Endurance, was added in 2012, which encompasses upholstery and flooring products.  Over the following years, Inspire, Living and Signature were added along with Brand tie ins with Ideal Home, and Lawrence Jim Bowen.

References

External links 
 

Furniture retailers of the United Kingdom
Companies listed on the London Stock Exchange
1894 establishments in England
British companies established in 1894
Companies based in Tyne and Wear
Retail companies established in 1894